Solido is a French manufacturing company which produces die-cast scale model cars, military vehicles, and commercial vehicles. Vehicles are usually made of zamac alloy in varying scales. Typically, Solido's main competition in France was Norev, but internationally, Polistil, Corgi Toys, Dinky Toys, Mercury, and Tekno produced similar style toys.

History 
"Solido" was the brand name established in 1930 by Ferdinand de Vazeilles of the "Fonderie de précision de Nanterre" in the western Paris suburb of Nanterre, France. The company was one of the first European firms to champion the "virtues of unbreakable diecast metal." Vazeilles' first product was a metal Gergovia brand spark plug on wheels. In 1932, some of the first vehicle kits were made in Zamac, labeled with the theme "toys with transformations" referring to their various bodies fitting on standard chassis, like the real coach builders and car manufacturers did at that time. Some were fitted with spring-loaded motors that would propel them across the floor. The feeling was somewhat like what Schuco was offering in Germany. In 1953, de Vazeilles bequeathed the company, then called Solijouets SA, to his son Jean René. By 1960, Vazeilles' three children, Charlotte, Jean and Colette were running it.

After World War II, the company factory was relocated farther west to the town of Ivry-la-Bataille in Normandy. In 1974, the company opened a new factory in Oulins. Later information on the Solido boxes labeled the company home as in nearby Anet, a postal designation.

At the end of the 1970s, during a financial crisis, Solido entered the Jouet Francais Group which included Jouef, Delacoste & Heller. The new company was called Heller-Solido SA, and the Vazeilles family no longer had control. At the end of 1980, this company went into liquidation and was purchased by Majorette. The Majorette takeover brought many cost-saving measures and though the Oulins factory remained in operation, some contract construction of toys took place at other facilities, including prisons.

First vehicles

The first Solido lines (Major, Junior and Baby) were introduced in 1932, 1933, and 1935, respectively. The Major series was 1:35 scale and had already been phased out by 1937 according to Edward Force. At this time several different cars were made, a few of different truck models, and also military guns and cannons. These were simpler toys, fragile and subject to metal fatigue.

In 1952, a smaller rather crude 1:60 scale 'Mosquito' series was introduced featuring 12 models. The first 1:43 scale '100' series was started in 1957 and this set the stage for Solido's ascendance, though models were not numbered until 1962, according to Force. The first military vehicles, for which Solido has become particularly well known, appeared in 1961.

Industry leader
Through the 1960s, models continually improved in detail and realism, and were often based on blueprints from actual car manufacturers. The '100' series was a combination of realistic production cars as well as competition models, mostly from European manufacturers. French Citroen, Peugeot, Renault and Matra were often the focus, but vehicles from Italy and Germany were also common. British marques were not as prevalent in the line-up. Various buses and trucks also began production.

Starting in 1964 Solido incorporated vintage vehicles, their L'Age d'Or (or Golden Age) line into their range, starting with the 1928 Mercedes SS. These were slightly larger and more complex than the leaders in the field at the time, the Matchbox Models of Yesteryear, and better finished but not as detailed as Rio Models. Making vintage cars had the advantage that they never grew out of date – indeed some models introduced in the mid-1960s were still being made when Solido renumbered their ranges in 1980. The L'Age d'Or range along with Matchbox and Rio were among the first diecast lines marketed to adults as much as children. As the 1960s progressed the models became lighter by using plastic bases, and the range concentrated increasingly on sports and racing cars. In comparison their great rivals French Dinky stayed with their tactics of modelling mostly the sedans on the French roads at the time. The late 1960s were a tough time for die-cast vehicle manufacturers in general, but Solido survived whereas French Dinky closed shop in 1971. In the mid-1970s, there were about 50 models in the standard Solido line.

By 1970, the company was fairly diversified, making a superior line of classic cars (L'Âge d'or – about 12 models), Les Militaires (about 40 models), commercial vehicles (Toner Gam – about 15 models), and "Poids Lourds", a series of larger heavier diecast trucks (about 10 different models). Several gift sets were available. During the early 1970s Solido became the benchmark of the collectible 1:43 scale diecast vehicle.

Solido's niche

Solido was known for realistic details that generally rejected the blatant commercialism of other toy companies. For example, Corgi and Dinky used flashy, but inauthentic "jewels" for head and tail lights while Solido distinguished itself by prudently using clear plastics for enhanced realism. If Solido had a weakness, it may have been in paint. At times colors seemed odd (like the bright green for the 1961 Thunderbird) and paint application was often thin and rather grainy. Rixon referred to it as "slightly hammered". By comparison, Bburago or Eligor Models had rich paint jobs with smooth and glossy finishes.

Some 1:43 scale diecasts like the Italian Polistil in the late 1960s with their Politoys M-Series, used a metal "wire" wheel, and Solido did as well in the early 1960s, but then beat that in their 100 and GAM 2 series in the 1970s by impressively copying the wheel styles from the actual vehicles. Thus Solidos usually had a unique wheel style for every model. To keep down production costs, the competition usually used one (often simple or unattractive) style common to most vehicles in their lines. Eventually, even for Solido, this became impractical and the company stopped using unique wheel designs around 1980. Another sign of uniqueness in detail were the web of gray plastic 'chains' seen on some trucks like 1974 Simca-Unic snow plough.

The trade-off in superior wheel detail was in not having all parts open or move, as seen with 
Politoys' M Series, Mebetoys or the German Gama Toys. Solidos would have an opening engine lid or doors, but not all parts moved. By the late 1970s, Solido's GAM 2 series more commonly had no moving parts. Nevertheless, Solido detail remained impeccable and their cars remained the industry standard (for the price) through the early 1990s, and with some touching-up held their own against collector models costing in the hundreds of dollars.

Packaging and marketing
Packaging varied from dull to brighter as time passed. Though some 1950s boxes were brighter red, white and yellow. In the early 1960s, boxes of a light green and white lettering with vehicles shown in a rust colored outline were common. Lighter colored blue or lavender boxes also appeared, but by the mid-1960s, this rather effeminate packaging gave way to more striking solid red boxes with lettering and car illustrated in white. The first of these red box cars were called the "bolide" (meteor or fireball) series, and gave the Solido models new excitement, and new masculinity. Most boxes in the 1970s and 1980s were some variation on red, yellow or orange, and then plastic 'display cases' were implemented with light cardboard coverings in various glossy colors.

Some 1960s Solidos were licensed to the Spanish company Dalia and made in Spain. On the boxes, however, the Solido name was given equal billing with Dalia. Another interesting marketing angle was that some Solido models, like the Chaparral 2G were marketed through the Marx toy company in the U.S. in the later 1960s and perhaps the early 1970s. The boxes for these, however, were 'Solido-like' and the Marx name was lower key. Compared to the competition of Matchbox, Hot Wheels, and even Corgi and Dinky in the states, however, these models did not appear to sell well. Solido, like many diecast manufacturers, also participated in various promotions where it suited them. For example, when French Sports Car maker Matra placed 1 and 2 at the 24-hour race of LeMans in 1972, it "made full marketing use" of Solido which made a patriotic red, white and blue (colors of the French flag) set of the two cars (long and short tail versions.

Verem subsidiary
In 1984, older Solido dies were made in a slightly simpler form, at least in packaging, and sold as the Verem brand, a subsidiary started by the Veron concern of Majorette, after taking over Solido. Many models were done tastefully, but the purpose of Verem is not entirely clear. It appears Verem was a cheaper line using older Solido dies.

Solido gradually introduced other sizes besides 1:43, such as the 1:18 Prestige line that was popular in the 1990s. The Mini Cooper in this larger size was made in 1:16 scale. As with most model makers, Solido also offered models in different promotional editions, like the Renault van decorated with "Vote for Coluche" markings. It was made when irreverent French comedian Michel Coluche briefly ran for president of the country, then pulled out when polls showed he actually might win.

Solido today
Majorette’s influence in the 1980s brought some simplification of models, but without harm to overall quality. In the mid-1990s, Majorette Toys purchased the Portuguese Novacars factory and formed a conglomerate called Ideal Loisirs. Solido production was halted for a time, until January 1996 when Triumph-Adler AG of Nürnberg, Germany, took over Idéal Loisirs/Majorette/Solido. Solido miniature production was commenced again.

About 2000, much production was shifted to China and dies from some other companies, like the Spanish Mira were used. Solido became part of toy producer Smoby when it bought Majorette in 2003. Smoby became part of the Simba Dickie Group which also owns German model producer Schuco. Reportedly, Majorette was to be divorced from Smoby again in 2008 and sold to MI29, a French investment fund which owns Bigben Interactive, but the Simba-Dickie website in early 2011 still included Majorette and Solido.

Over the last decade, Solido 1:43 scale cars have moved into a slightly more premium and detailed model – more for the collector and less for children – though Solido still offers the same similar lines of "Yesterday", "Today", "l'age d'or", "1960s", and a variety of competition models. Prices also seem to still be relatively competitive, with most 1:43 scale vehicles going for a reasonable $20.00 while larger 1:18 scales sell for $40.00 to $70.00, which is also typical for large scale. Price is kept reasonable, mainly because most models are now made in China.

Catalog content analysis
Though the focus has always been French vehicles, that emphasis has magnified somewhat over time. An inspection of 115 vehicles in the 1975 catalog shows 48 percent of Solido offerings to be French made vehicles (Berliet, Saviem, Renault, Peugeot, Citroen, Simca, Matra, etc.) with nine countries represented (Famous Miniatures 1975). German offerings came to 26 percent. Italian – 18%, and Great Britain, New Zealand, Sweden, Spain, Russia and the United States were all represented. Marques from the U.S. were 10 percent of the offerings.

A count of all French vehicles of the 175 portrayed on the Solido website in 2010 came to 52%. While German vehicles made up 10% fewer offerings, Japanese vehicles were 12% (no Japanese vehicles appeared in 1975), beating the Italian (11%) and British (6%) offerings. American vehicles were only 2% of vehicles – mainly military vehicles of the past, which is different from Solido of the 1980s when Cadillacs, Thunderbirds and Studebakers, among others, were offered. American, German, Italian, and British models were less prevalent after 35 years, and three fewer countries were represented. 
 
Over the decades, there has been a shift towards showcasing more French brands and less international variety in the offerings. This trend reflects a certain sense of nationalism in the automotive industry. Traditional Solido lines have been maintained, but the company seems to be in heavier competition, not only with Norev, but with the likes of French Eligor and Portuguese Vitesse in the selection, fit and finish of models.

References
 The Famous Miniatures Solido. 1975. Annual catalog. Printed in France.

Footnotes

See also 

 Model car

External links

 
Personal website about military models (French)
Diecast military models collectors site

Die-cast toys
Model manufacturers of France
Toy cars and trucks
Toy brands
French brands
Simba Dickie Group
Toy companies established in 1930
French companies established in 1930